Darren Jefferies (born 17 October 1993) is a professional footballer who plays as a plays as a midfielder. He resigned for Frome Town in September 2015 after a spell with BK sport in Swedish Football Division 3. He began his career with Bristol Rovers.

He was awarded his first professional contract in 2010, when he was given a -year deal by Bristol Rovers on his seventeenth birthday after being a regular for the under-18s team, captaining them at the age of 17. Also a regular in the reserves sides and was an unused substitute for the first team regularly. He made his debut for The Pirates as a 67th-minute replacement for Oliver Norburn in an FA Cup second-round tie on 4 December 2011.

His first goal for Frome Town came away at Cambridge City and proved to be the winning goal in a 2–1 win. He went on to net 3 times in 38 appearances for the Robins before a move to Sweden in search of full-time football in April 2013. On 2 April, he signed for division 3 side BK sport in Sweden.

References

External links
Due to a spelling error on Soccerbase, Jefferies has two records:

Darren Jefferies profile on Bristol Rovers' official website

1993 births
Living people
Sportspeople from Swindon
English footballers
Association football midfielders
Bristol Rovers F.C. players